Bouhadid is a village in the commune of El Ouata, in Béchar Province, Algeria. The village is located on the northeast bank of the Oued Saoura just north of El Ouata, and southeast of Tamtert.

References

Neighbouring towns and cities

Populated places in Béchar Province